Move is a 1970 American comedy film starring Elliott Gould, Paula Prentiss and Geneviève Waïte, and directed by Stuart Rosenberg. The screenplay was written by Joel Lieber and Stanley Hart, adapted from a novel by Lieber.

Plot 
The film covers three days in the life of Hiram Jaffe, a would-be playwright who supplements his living as a porn writer and by walking dogs. He and his wife, Dolly, are moving to a new apartment on New York's Upper West Side. Jaffe is beset by problems, including his inability to persuade the moving man to move the couple's furniture, and retreats into fantasy.

Cast 
 Elliott Gould as Hiram Jaffe
 Paula Prentiss as Dolly Jaffe
 Geneviève Waïte as Girl
 John Larch as Patrolman
 Joe Silver as Oscar
 Graham Jarvis as Dr. Picker
 Ron O'Neal as Peter
 Garrie Beau as Andrea
 Mae Questel Mrs. Katz

Production

Original novel
The film was based on Move!, a novel by Joel Lieber which was published in 1968. The Chicago Tribune called the novel "largely amusing, sometimes puzzling." The New York Times called it "very funny."

Development
In February 1968, before the novel had been published, 20th Century Fox announced they had bought the screen rights for $85,000. They called it a "dirty Barefoot in the Park." Stuart Rosenberg was to direct, Pandro Berman to produce and Dustin Hoffman to star. Lieber did the first screenplay.

By February 1969, the lead had become Elliott Gould. In March, Gould signed a non-exclusive four-picture contract with Fox, the first of which was to be MASH and the second was supposed to be Move. Paula Prentiss signed in July. Shortly after, Genevieve Waite, who had been in Joanna, was announced as the third lead.

Gould was going to make Move after MASH when Columbia came to him with Getting Straight so he delayed the film to do that one. "Columbia said if I didn't take the part they'd drop it", he said. "I was the only actor they'd go with. I was never so flattered in my life."

Reception
The film was as a box-office failure. However, according to Fox records the film required $4,905,000 in rentals to break even and by 11 December 1970 had made $5,000,000 so made a small profit to the studio.

Roger Greenspun of The New York Times wrote "Though I can remember some very good moments, I can also remember too many lapses, loose ends, failures in energy and invention...Both Elliott Gould and Paula Prentiss have been shortchanged by their roles, or by their director—to the extent that often you can catch them apparently waiting (in character) for something to do." Arthur D. Murphy of Variety wrote "'Move' walks the tightrope of zany comedy-fantasy, and doesn't it make it across...Gould has to carry the film singlehandedly, and the burden is much too great. Although only 90 minutes, film's pacing is lethargic." Gene Siskel of the Chicago Tribune gave the film two stars out of four and wrote that the fantasy sequences didn't work because "it is not always possible to tell which events are real and which are fantasy. The cause for this is not a clever script, but that one doesn't care to tell the difference. There's no reward. In other words, the central script idea has no meaning other than as a device." Kevin Thomas of the Los Angeles Times declared it "one of those pictures that seem funnier at the time than they are in retrospect, and it has a vivid if familiar central character but virtually no story. It is really but still another variation on '8½,' with a hero in whom you cannot tell when reality leaves off and fantasy begins." Gary Arnold of The Washington Post called it "a trifling new comedy vehicle for Elliott Gould. Although it's easy enough to sit through, the picture is so undemanding and insubstantial that it leaves no impression and no aftertaste."

Gould later said ""there were great elements in it" but felt Rosenberg while "a sweet man and a talented filmmaker...Comedy wasn’t his main field. There was a problem with the script, and I would always defer to the writers, to the director. I didn’t know that I might have gotten involved to develop something that might have fused Move."

Gould later was offered the lead role in Rosenberg's Pocket Money but turned it down because he did not want to work with Rosenberg again.

Lieber died by suicide in May 1971, aged 35.

Notes

See also
 List of American films of 1970

References
  - Access date: April 12, 2009

External links 
 
Review of book at Kirkus

1970 films
1970 comedy films
20th Century Fox films
American comedy films
Films scored by Marvin Hamlisch
Films about writers
Films based on American novels
Films directed by Stuart Rosenberg
Films set in New York City
1970s English-language films
1970s American films